Gironda Battery may refer to the following batteries in Gozo, Malta:
Mġarr Battery
Ramla Right Battery
Saint Mary's Battery (Marsalforn)